A by-election was held for the New South Wales Legislative Assembly electorate of The Tumut on 1 November 1860 because the by-election in May 1860 was declared void by the Election and Qualifications Committee. Daniel Deniehy was declared elected, however he was also elected at the East Macquarie by-election held on the same day. Deniehy took his seat as the member for East Macquarie and doesn't appear in the records kept by the Legislative Assembly as a member for Tumut.

Dates

Result

The by-election in May 1860 was overturned by the Election and Qualifications Committee due to voting irregularities. Daniel Deniehy had been elected at the East Macquarie by-election and decided to represent that seat.

See also
Electoral results for the district of Tumut
List of New South Wales state by-elections

References

1860 elections in Australia
New South Wales state by-elections
1850s in New South Wales